Dewandaru Airport  is an airport serving Karimunjawa, an archipelago in Central Java province of Indonesia.  Dewandaru Airport is located on Kemujan Island in Karimunjawa. Kemujan Island is considered to be a part of Karimun Island, the largest island in Karimunjawa, as both islands are only separated by a small river. The distance from the airport to the city centre at Karimun Island is 22 kilometres. Dewandaru airport has one runway, with dimensions of 1,200 metres (3,937 ft) by 30 metres (98 ft) which allows the operation of aircraft up to ATR 72-600.

Etymology 
The name of this airport comes from the endemic tree of Karimunjawa, called Dewandaru. According to a local belief, the ship of anyone who takes the wood of Dewandaru would sink on leaving Karimunjawa, although taking just a little part of it.

Airlines and destinations 

The following airlines offer scheduled passenger service:

References 

Airports in Central Java
Transport in Central Java